Gerald Joseph "Gerry" Shea (October 26, 1881 – May 3, 1964) was a Major League Baseball catcher. In 2 career games, he had two hits in six at-bats. It is unknown which hand he batted with and he threw right-handed. He was apparently the first major league player to graduate from Creighton University.

Shea was born in Omaha, Nebraska, and died in Berkeley, Missouri.

External links

1881 births
1964 deaths
Sportspeople from Omaha, Nebraska
St. Louis Cardinals players
Major League Baseball catchers
Baseball players from Missouri
Baseball players from Nebraska